Northland is a brief (approximately 20 minutes running time) 1942 Canadian documentary film on the life of miners, which was directed by the expatriate German crime writer, jazz critic, jazz musician, and sexologist Ernest Borneman. It is a production of the National Film Board of Canada.

External links
 NFB Web page
 

1942 films
English-language Canadian films
Canadian black-and-white films
National Film Board of Canada documentaries
Canadian short documentary films
1942 documentary films
Black-and-white documentary films
Documentary films about mining
National Film Board of Canada short films
Quebec films
1940s Canadian films
1940s English-language films